The men's épée was a competition in fencing at the 2004 Summer Olympics in Athens. A total of 37 men from 21 nations competed in this event. Each nation was limited to 3 fencers. Competition took place in the Fencing Hall at the Helliniko Olympic Complex on August 17. The event was won by Marcel Fischer of Switzerland, the nation's first victory in the event and first medal of any color since 1952. Wang Lei's silver was China's first medal in the men's individual épée. Defending champion Pavel Kolobkov earned bronze, finishing a set of three different-colored Olympic medals in the event (silver in 1992, gold in 2000). Kolobkov was the fourth man to earn three medals in the event and had the best record of any of the four; only Ramón Fonst (with two gold medals) had more individual Olympic success in the men's épée. It was the fifth consecutive Games in which a Russian fencer reached the podium, including medals for Russian fencers competing for the Soviet Union (1988) and Unified Team (1992).

Background

This was the 24th appearance of the event, which was not held at the first Games in 1896 (with only foil and sabre events held) but has been held at every Summer Olympics since 1900.

Four of the eight quarterfinalists from 2000 returned: gold medalist (and 1992 silver medalist) Pavel Kolobkov of Russia, silver medalist Hugues Obry of France, fourth-place finisher Marcel Fischer of Switzerland, and eighth-place finisher Zhao Gang of China. The reigning (2003) World Champion was Fabrice Jeannet of France; Kolobkov (1993, 1994, and 2002) and Obry (1998) were also prior World Champions.

Algeria made its debut in the event. France and the United States each appeared for the 22nd time, tied for most among nations.

Competition format

The competition continued to use the entirely single-elimination (with bronze medal match) format introduced in 1996. All bouts were to 15 touches.

Schedule

All times are Greece Standard Time (UTC+2)

Results

Preliminary round

As there were more than 32 entrants in this event, five first round matches were held to reduce the field to 32 fencers.

Main tournament bracket

The remaining field of 32 fencers competed in a single-elimination tournament to determine the medal winners. Semifinal losers proceeded to a bronze medal match.

Results summary

References

Yahoo! Sports Athens 2004 Summer Olympics Fencing Results

Men's epee
Men's events at the 2004 Summer Olympics